Bisola Makanjuola (born 29 August 1996) is a Nigerian freestyle wrestler. She won two silver and two gold medals in the African Championship between 2014 and 2020.

Sports career 
Bisola first win at the African Championship was in 2014 in Tunis where she competed in the 55 kilo category and earned a silver medal. In 2017, she participated at the same event but this time held in Marrakech, Morocco and also won a silver medal in the 60kg category.

At the  Port Harcourt in 2018 where the African Championship held, Makanjuola defeated her opponent and came first in the 59kg winning the gold medal. 

The 2020 African Wrestling Championship competition at Algeir also ended with her victory as Makanjuola won the gold medal for the 59kg category.

References 

1996 births
Living people
Nigerian female sport wrestlers
Yoruba sportswomen
African Wrestling Championships medalists
21st-century Nigerian women